WPCD (88.7 FM) is a radio station broadcasting an Alternative format. Licensed to Champaign, Illinois, United States, the station serves the Illinois college area District 505.  WPCD FM  88.7 is the educational, non-commercial radio station of Parkland College. 88.7 broadcasts 24 hours a day, 7 days a week, with an indie/alternative rock format. It serves as a hands-on learning lab for students in COM 141 and 142. Students hone their skills by working at WPCD in a variety of capacities. Our power of 10,500 watts covers all of Parkland College’s District 505 area and much of East Central Illinois, including Danville, Decatur, Rantoul, Bloomington, and all of Champaign-Urbana, reaching close to 200,000 people..

References

External links
88.7 WPCD direct link, including streaming music: http://www.parkland.edu/WPCD

Champaign, Illinois
PCD
PCD
Radio stations established in 1983